Amzath Khan is an Indian actor, who is known and famous for acting in Maya (2015) and Kaithi (2019).

Career
Seeking a career in media, Amzath pursued an MBA in film marketing and finance and briefly worked at Sony Pictures and then as the marketing head at an FM station - Radio One. He joined the theatre company, Stray Factory, hoping to get a breakthrough in films and worked on the film Pugaippadam (2010), which had a low-key release. He subsequently continued acting in short films made for the reality show, Naalaiya Iyakkunar. After a spell away from films, he successfully auditioned for the role of basketball player Guna in Arivazhagan Venkatachalam's sports drama, Vallinam (2015). The film won positive reviews from critics and performed averagely at the box office, though Amzath's performance was well-received, prompting further film offers. He starred in the horror film Rum (2017).

Filmography

Film

Television

References

External links

Living people
Male actors in Tamil cinema
21st-century Indian male actors
Year of birth missing (living people)